Cyptotrama is a genus of mushrooms in the family Physalacriaceae.

Species
Cyptotrama asprata (Berk.) Redhead & Ginns (1980)
Cyptotrama chrysopepla (Berk. & M.A. Curtis) Singer (1973)
Cyptotrama costesii (Speg.) Singer (1973)
Cyptotrama dennisii Singer (1973)
Cyptotrama depauperata Singer (1977)
Cyptotrama deseynesiana (Pegler) Redhead & Ginns (1980)
Cyptotrama fagiphila Vila, Pérez-Butrόn and P.-A. Moreau (2015)
Cyptotrama granulosa (Romell) Redhead & Ginns (1980)
Cyptotrama hygrocyboides Singer (1969)
Cyptotrama lachnocephala (Pat.) Singer (1973)
Cyptotrama macrobasidia Singer (1960)
Cyptotrama nivea Singer (1989)
Cyptotrama pauper Singer (1989)
Cyptotrama platense Singer (1969)
Cyptotrama songolara Courtec. (1995)
Cyptotrama verruculosa (Singer) Singer (1973)

References

Agaricales genera
Physalacriaceae
Taxa named by Rolf Singer